Red Roses for Me is a four-act play written by Irish playwright Seán O'Casey which premiered at the Olympia Theatre in Dublin in 1943. The story is set against the backdrop of the Dublin Lockout of 1913, events in which O'Casey himself had participated.

External links 
 
 Words of the title song 'Red Roses for Me'

Plays by Seán O'Casey
Broadway plays